Delphinella balsameae is a species of fungus in the family Dothioraceae. It is a known plant pathogen, reported to cause blight in Siberian fir in Russia, balsam fir, white fir and subalpine fir in North-America.

References

External links

Fungi described in 1962
Dothideales